The DCMA Civilian Career Service Award (CCSA) is one of four honorary medals presented to civilians in the United States by the Defense Contract Management Agency (DCMA) for outstanding service.

References

Awards and decorations of the United States Department of Defense